FK Balkan may refer to:
FK Balkan Mirijevo, Mirijevo, Belgrade, Serbia, formerly known as OFK Balkan Mirijevo and FK Balkan Bukovica
FK Balkan Skopje, North Macedonia
FC Balkan Botevgrad, Botevgrad, Bulgaria

See also
Nebitçi FT, Balkanabat, Turkmenistan, formerly known as Balkan FK
FBK Balkan, Malmö, Sweden
FC Balkany Zorya, Zorya, Ukraine
KF Ballkani (FC Ballkani), Suharekë, Kosovo